is a Japanese novelist and short story writer. She is a recipient of the Yomiuri Prize.

History 
Matsuura was born in Matsuyama, Ehime Prefecture in Japan. Her middle school years were passed in Marugame, Kagawa Prefecture.

She went from Marugame West Middle School to Kagawa Prefecture Otemae Middle School, a private school in the area. Matsuura attended Aoyama Gakuin University where she majored in French literature. In her teens, she had read Marquis de Sade and Jean Genet, and she wished to be in the French literature department so she could read their works in the original language. In 1978, while enrolled at school, she won the  award for writing "The Day of the Funeral", her first book. In 1987, her book Natural Woman was given a rave review by Kenji Nakagami, bringing attention to her. In 1994, her book Apprenticeship of Big Toe P, about the travels of a woman whose big toe on her right foot turns into a penis, won the Women Writers' Prize and was nominated for the Mishima Yukio Prize. The book also went on to be a bestseller. Also in 1994, she co-wrote a film adaptation of Natural Woman, which was released in 1994.

Seven years passed between Apprenticeship of Big Toe P and Opposite Version, and another seven until Kenshin was published. The latter book, published in 2007, won the Yomiuri Prize in 2008. She is currently a committee member for the Shinchō New Writers Award.

Bibliography 
 (1980)
 (1981)
 (1987)
 (1993); English translation by Michael Emmerich (Kodansha, 2010)
 (essay) (1994)
 (essay) (1994); English translation by Amanda Seaman in Woman Critiqued, ed. Rebecca Copeland (University of Hawai'i Press, 2006)
 (1998)
 (2007)
 (2007)

References

External links
 Rieko Matsuura at J'Lit Books from Japan 
 Synopsis of The Apprenticeship of Big Toe P at JLPP (Japanese Literature Publishing Project) 

Japanese women short story writers
People from Matsuyama, Ehime
Aoyama Gakuin University alumni
1958 births
Living people
Yomiuri Prize winners